Alberto Manuel Rodríguez-Gallego González de Mendoza (21 January 1923 – 12 December 2011) was an Argentine film actor who appeared in some 114 films between 1930 and 2005, spanning eight decades.

A lifelong figure in Argentine films, De Mendoza appeared in film such as Adán y la serpiente in 1946 and A hierro muere in 1962 often working alongside Olga Zubarry. In the late 1960s and 1970 he appeared in a number of spaghetti Westerns. and also had a prominent role in the 1973 horror classic Horror Express, in which he co-starred alongside Christopher Lee, Peter Cushing and Telly Savalas.

De Mendoza is better known to audiences in Argentina for his role in the popular TV series El Rafa, aired from 1980 to 1982, or the less successful El Oriental, aired from 1982 to 1983. He died in Madrid on 12 December 2011, at age 88.

Selected filmography

TV series 
 1980-1982 – El Rafa
 1982 - El Oriental

References

External links 
 

1923 births
2011 deaths
Argentine male actors
Male actors from Buenos Aires
Male Spaghetti Western actors
20th-century Argentine male actors
21st-century Argentine male actors